The Surprise Truss Bridge in Ten Mile, Tennessee was built in 1917.  It was listed on the National Register of Historic Places in 1982.

It crosses Sewee Creek and was built by the Champion Bridge Co. of Wilmington, Ohio.

The bridge has one steel bedstead/truss leg span.  It is pinconnected and uses a Pratt truss configuration.

References

Bridges in Tennessee
Truss bridges
National Register of Historic Places in Meigs County, Tennessee
Bridges completed in 1917